The Supersport World Championship, abbreviated to WorldSSP, is a motorcycle racing competition on hard-surfaced circuits, based on mid-sized sports motorcycles. Competition machines were originally based on production-based motorcycles with 600 cc to 750 cc engines, depending on the number of cylinders. After trials in UK national series British Supersport, from 2022 the regulations have changed to allow eligibility of larger-displacement engines, to reflect the engine sizes being produced and encourage different manufacturers. 

The championship runs as a support class to the Superbike World Championship, which is similarly based on large production-based sports motorcycles. The championship, organized and promoted as its parent series by FGSport—renamed Infront Motor Sports in 2008—until 2012 and by Dorna from the 2013 season onwards, is sanctioned by the FIM.

Overview
Supersport was introduced as a support class to the Superbike World Championship in 1990 as a European Championship. In 1997 the championship became a "World Series" and the European title was given to the European Motorcycle Union's European Road Racing Championship. The full title Supersport World Championship was introduced in 1999. Supersport racing has also been one of the most popular classes of national racing for many years.

Competition in the championship is typically fierce, and season domination by a single competitor is unusual. The 2001 championship was particularly notable in this respect, the champion being Andrew Pitt who did not win a single race, but amassed a championship-winning total of points by finishing near the front of the field in almost every race.

Regulations

Technical regulations

In 2012, to be eligible for Supersport World Championship, a motorcycle must satisfy FIM's homologation requirements and have a four-stroke engine in one of the following configurations:
 Between  – 4 cylinders
 Between  – 3 cylinders
 Between  – 2 cylinders

As of 2022, the homologated motorcycles were Ducati Panigale V2, Honda CBR600RR, Kawasaki ZX-6R, MV Agusta F3 800, Suzuki GSX-R750, Triumph Street Triple 765RS and Yamaha YZF-R6; formerly homologated motorcycles include Bimota YB9, Ducati 748, Ducati 749, Honda CBR600F, MV Agusta F3 675, Triumph Daytona 600, Triumph Daytona 675, and Yamaha YZF600R.

Supersport regulations are much tighter than in Superbikes. The chassis of a supersport machine must remain largely as standard, while engine tuning is possible but tightly regulated. For instance, the displacement capacity, bore and stroke must remain at the homologated size. Modifying the bore and stroke to reach class limits is not allowed. As in World Superbike, a control tyre is used. From 2020 onwards, the tyres no longer have to be road legal and therefore slicks are allowed.

Sporting regulations
A Supersport World Championship race takes place at almost every Superbike World Championship round. Starting positions are decided by the riders' fastest laps from two 45-minute qualifying sessions. Typically, the race takes place between the two Superbike races.

The points system is the same for the riders' championship and the manufacturers' championship, but only the highest-finishing motorcycle by a particular manufacturer is awarded the points for the latter championship.

Riders
Riders from all over the world compete in World Supersport, mostly from Europe.

Several riders who were successful in World Supersport have moved on to high-level competitions, notably, Cal Crutchlow, Chaz Davies, and Chris Vermeulen, though others such as Fabien Foret and Kenan Sofuoğlu have spent several years in this championship.

Notable female rider María Herrera entered a few races in World Supersport.

Champions

See also
Superbike racing
Grand Prix motorcycle racing
Isle of Man TT

References

External links

 
Supersport racing
Motorcycle road racing series
World motorcycle racing series